This is a list of the main career statistics of former tennis player Pancho Gonzales whose career ran from 1947 until 1974.

As an amateur player, Gonzales won at least 17 singles titles, including two Grand Slam tournaments. As a professional player, he won at least 85 singles titles, including 12 Pro Slam tournaments; at the same time he was banned from competing in the Grand Slam events from 1950 to 1967 due to being a professional player. During this professional period, he won seven times the World Pro Tour. The Open era arrived very late for Gonzales, by which time he was in his forties. Even at this advanced age he was able to win at least 11 singles titles. Overall Gonzales won at least 113 titles in his career in a span of 25 years.

 Major titles 

Performance timeline

Gonzales started playing professional tennis in 1950 and was unable to compete in 73 Grand Slam tournaments until the start of the Open Era at the 1968 French Open. (NH = not held).

Grand Slam and Pro Slam finals

Singles

Grand Slam finals (2–0)

Pro Slam finals (13–6)

Career titles

Amateur eraSingles (1948–1949) : 17 titlesProfessional eraSingles (1950–1967) : 85 titlesNotes: All tournaments with a final pro set are basically 4-men tournaments.
 1 : 4-men tournaments

 2 : T.O.C. = Tournament of Champions.

Open eraSingles (1968–1972) : 10Professional toursSingles (1950–1961) : 10 tours'''

References

 Sources 
 Michel Sutter, Vainqueurs Winners 1946–2003, Paris 2003.
 World Tennis Magazines.
 Joe McCauley, The History of Professional Tennis'', London 2001.

Gonzales, Pancho